Darghama ibn Malik al-Taghlibi (Arabic: ضَرغامه بن مالک تَغلُبی) was one of the martyrs of Karbala.

Lineage 
He is known as "al-Taghlibi" because of his attribution to Banu Taghlib. Banu Taghlib was a tribe originating from Taghlib ibn Wa'il ibn Qasit.

An the day of Ashura 
On the day of Ashura, he injured and killed some enemies during the battle. He was martyred in the first battle on Ashura. It is said that he declaimed the following during the battle:

Prepare for Malik Dargham

The blow of a young man who defends dignified people

He hopes for a full reward from God

References 

Husayn ibn Ali
Hussainiya
People killed at the Battle of Karbala